Ružica Milosavljević (née Jovanović; born 29 April 1946), also known as Ružica Milosavljević-Jovanović, is a Serbian chess player who holds the title of Woman International Master (WIM, 1971). She won the Yugoslav Women's Chess Championship in 1969.

Biography
In the late 1960s and early 1970s, Ružica Milosavljević was one of the leading Yugoslav women's chess players. In 1969, she won the Yugoslav Women's Chess Championship. In 1971, she participated at the Women's World Chess Championship Interzonal Tournament in Ohrid and shared 11th-12th place. Also in 1971, she was awarded the FIDE Woman International Master (WIM) title.

Her highest ranking on the FIDE women's rating list was No. 44 in July 1972, while her highest Elo rating was 2205 in January 1990.

References

External links
 
 
 Ružica Milosavljević chess games at 365Chess.com

1946 births
Sportspeople from Belgrade
Serbian female chess players
Yugoslav female chess players
Chess Woman International Masters
Living people